Basil Pesambili Mramba (15 May 1940 – 17 August 2021) was a Tanzanian CCM politician who served as Member of Parliament for the Rombo constituency from 2004 to 2014.

Biography
In 2015, he and former minister Daniel Yona were sentenced to three years' imprisonment for awarding an audit contract to UK firm Alex Stewart Assayers which meant its operations in Tanzania were exempt from tax. After seven months in prison, the remainder of Mramba's and Yona's sentence was commuted to community service.

He died from complications of COVID-19 on 17 August 2021 in Dar es Salaam at the age of 81 during the COVID-19 pandemic in Tanzania.

References

1940 births
2021 deaths
Chama Cha Mapinduzi MPs
Tanzanian MPs 2005–2010
Finance Ministers of Tanzania
Tabora Boys Secondary School alumni
Makerere University alumni
Alumni of City, University of London
People from Kilimanjaro Region
Deaths from the COVID-19 pandemic in Tanzania